James Linton may refer to:
 James Linton (bishop), Anglican bishop
 James Dromgole Linton, English artist
 James Linton (hacker), email prankster and social engineer
 James Walter Robert Linton (1869–1947) West Australian artist and teacher